The bibliography of ʻAmr ibn Baḥr al-Jāḥiẓ (ca. 773 - 869) are the titles listed in chapter five of al-Fihrist of Isḥāq al-Nadīm (d. ca. 998).  Most of Chap. V, §1 survives only in the Beatty MS and is published in the English edition by Bayard Dodge (New York, 1970). An incomplete list is found also in the Irshād al-Arīb alā Ma’rifat al-Adīb ('Dictionary of Learned Men') by Yāqūt al-Hamawī (1179-1229).

Published works
Kitāb al-Ḥayawān ‘Book of the Animal’; in seven sections is dedicated to Muḥammad ibn ‘Abd al-Mālik al-Zayyāt, who paid him 5,000 gold coins (5., dīnār). 
Kitāb al-Nisā’ ‘Women’; on differences between the sexes. Appended to Al-Ḥayawān.
Kitāb al-Bighāl ‘The Mules’. Al-Nadīm saw these two books written in the handwriting of Zakarīyā’ ibn Yaḥyā ibn Sulaymān, Abū Yaḥyā, who was a warrāq (scribe) of al-Jāḥiẓ.
Kitāb al-Ibil ‘The Camel’; Al-Nadīm notes this book did not resemble the style of al-Jāḥiẓ.
Kitāb al-Bayān wa-al-Tabyīn 'The Book of Eloquence and Exposition'; dedicated to Ibn Abī Dā’ūd, who paid him 5,000 gold coins.
Kitāb al-Zar’ wa-al-Nakhl 'The Book of Sowing and the Palm Tree’; dedicated to Ibrāhīm ibn ‘Abbās al-Ṣūlī, who paid him 5,000 gold coins.

Bibliography list from Beatty MS of al-Fihrist 

Kitāb al-Bayān wa-al-Tabyīn ‘Explanation and Exposition’; 
Al-Zar’ wa-al-Nakhl ‘Sowing and the Palm Tree’
Al-Farq bayn al-Nabī wa-al-Mutanabbī ‘The Difference between a Prophet and One Claiming to Be a Prophet’;
Al-Ma‘rifah ‘Knowledge’;
Jawābāt min jawāb Kitāb al-Ma’rifah The Replies of the Book of Knowledge;
Masā’īl Kitāb al-Ma’rifah 'Questions of the Book of Knowledge'; 
Al-radd ‘alā ṣihāb al-ālhāmi 'Refutation of Those Who Claim to Have Divine Inspiration';
Naẓm al-Qur’ān, thalāthat nusakh 'Order of the Qur’ān, three copies’;
Masā’īl fī’l-Qur’ān 'Questions in the Qur’ān;
Fadhīlah al-Mu‘tazilah 'Excellence of the Mu‘tazilah;
Al-radd ‘alā al-Mushabbihah Refutation of the Mushabbihah;
Ḥikāyat Qawl Aṣnaf al-Zaydīyah Statement about the Declaration of the Branches of the Zaydīyah’
 Al-Imāmat ‘alā madhhab al-Shī’ah 'The Imamate, according to the Doctrine of the Shī’ah'.
 Al-‘Uthmānīyah
 Historical Traditions and How They Are Valid;
 Refutation of the Christians;
 The Heavy-Spoken Man of al-Mirbad;
 Refutation of the ‘Uthmānīyah;
 The Caliphate of Mu’āwiyah;
Imāmat Banī al-‘Abbās ‘The Caliphate of the ‘Abbāsids’
Al-Fityan ‘The Two Youths’
Al-Quwwād The Leaders (Military Chiefs)
Al-Luṣūṣ ‘The Robbers’
 Dhikr mā bayn al-Zaydīyah wa-al-Rāfiḍah() 'Mention of what is [shared] between the Zaydīyah and the Rāfiḍah';
Al-Tawḥīd ‘Discourse about Oneness’
Ṣanā'ah al-Kalām The Art (Formation) of Speech;
Taṣwib ‘Alī fī taḥkīm al-ḥakamīn ‘Praising of ‘Alī, about giving authority to the judges’
Wujūb al-Imāmah ‘Things Necessary for the Caliphate’
Al-Aṣnām ‘Idols’
Al-Wukalā’ wa-al-Muwakkalīn ‘Deputies and Guardians’
Al-Shārib wa-al-Mashrūb ‘The Drinker and What Is Drunk’
 Iftikhār al-Shitā’ wa-al-Sayf ‘The Glory of Winter and Summer’
Al-Mu‘allimīn ‘The Teachers’
Al-Jawārī ‘Slave Girls; or Al-Ḥawārī ‘Associates’;
Nawādir al-Ḥusn ‘Rare Forms of Goodness ‘; or Nawādir al-Ḥasan ‘Rare Anecdotes about al-Ḥasan’
Al-Bukhalā’ ‘The Misers’
Farq ma bayn fī ‘Abd Shams wa-Makhzūm The Difference between the Banū ‘Abd Shams and Makhzūm;
Al-‘Urjān wa-al-Burṣān ‘The Lame and the Lepers’;
Takhir al-Qaḥṭānīa wa-al-‘Adnānīa Nobility of the Members of Qaḥṭān and ‘Adnān;
Al-Tarbi‘ wa-al-Tadwīr ‘Making a Quadrangle and a Circle’
Al-Tufaylīyīn ‘Humble Companions’
Akhlāq al-Mulūk ‘Dispositions of the Kings’
Al-Futyā ‘The Judicial Interpretation’
Manāqib Jund al-Khilāfah wa-Faḍā’il al-Atrāk Excellence of the Troops of the Caliphate and Superior Qualities of the Turks’.
Al-Ḥāsid wa-al-Maḥsūd ‘The Envious and the Envied’
Al-radd ‘alā al-Hūdd Refutation of the Jews;
Al-Ṣuraḥā’ wa-al-Hujanā’ The Pure [-Blooded] and the Sons of Slave Mothers
Al-Sūdān wa-al-Bīḍān ‘The Blacks and the Whites’
Al-Ma‘ād wa-al-Ma‘āsh ‘Life in the Next World and the Present Life’
Al-Nisā’ ‘Women’ (See published books)
Al-Taswīyah bayn al-‘Arab wa-al-‘Ajam 'Comparison between the Arabs and Persians (Foreigners);
Al-Sultān wa-IkhlāwahluhuThe Government (Al-Sultan) and the Dispositions of Its People (Administrators);
Al-Wa’īd ‘The Threat’
Al-Buldān ‘The Towns’ (Regions)
Al-Akhbār ‘Historical Traditions
Al-Dalālah ‘alā an al-Imāmah Farḍ ‘The Demonstration that the Imamate is a Divine Command’
Al-Istiṭā’ah wa-Khalq al-Af‘āl 'Predestination and Creation of Action';
Al-Muqayyinīn wa-al-Ghanā’ wa-al-Ṣan‘ah ‘The Artisans (Saddle Makers), Wealth and Craftwork’
Al-Hadāyā ‘Gifts’
Al-Manḥūl ‘The Emaciated’ (The Plagiarized)
Al-Ikhwān ‘The Brothers’
Al-radd ‘alā man al-Ḥad fī kitāb Allāh ‘Refutation of Whoever Has Apostatized, about the Book of Allāh’
Ay al-Qur’ān ‘What Is the Qur’ān?’
Al-‘Āshiq al-Nāshī al-Mutalāshī ‘The Amorous: Growing Hot, Growing Cold’
Ḥanūt ‘Aṭṭār ‘A Perfume Shop’
Al-Tamthīl ‘The Comparison’
Faḍl al-‘Ilm ‘The Excellence of Learning’
Al-Mirāh wa-al-Jadd ‘Gaiety and Earnestness’
Jamharat al-Mulūk ‘The Assembly of Kings’
Al-Ṣawālijah ‘Polo Sticks’
Dhamm al-Zinā’ ‘Denouncing Fornication’
Al-Tafakkur wa-al-I‘tibār ‘Meditation and Consideration’
Al-Ḥujjah wa-al-Nubūwah ‘Proof and Prophecy’
Al-mukātabah ‘to Ibrāhīm ibn al-Mudabbir about correspondence’
Iḥālat al-Qudrah ‘alā al-Ẓulm ‘The Trickery of Force [Employed] against Oppression’
Ummahāt al-Awlād ‘Freed Slave Mothers of Children’
Al-I‘tizāl wa-Faḍluhu ‘an al-Faḍīlah ‘The Doctrine of the Mu‘tazilah and Its Excellence Due to Superior Virtue’
Al-Akhṭār wa-al-Marātib wa-al-Ṣinā‘āt ‘Dignities, Ranks, and Professions’
Uḥdūthat al-‘Ālam ‘Story of the World’
Al-Radd 'alā man za'amān al-Insān juz lā yatajazza 'Refutation of Whoever Supposes that Man Is One Piece (Juz’) and Not Divided (Yatajazza’)
 Abū al-Najm wa-jawābhu() 'Abū al-Najm and His Reply';
Al-Tuffāḥ ‘The Apple’
Al-Uns wa-al-Salwah ‘Social Life and Contentment’
Al-Ḥazm wa-al-‘Azm ‘Steadfastness and Resolution’
Al-Kibar al-Mustaḥsan wa-al-Mustaqbah ‘The Great, the Beautiful, and the Ugly’
Naqḍ al-Ṭibb ‘Refutation of Medicine’
‘Unāṣir al-Ādāb ‘The Elements of Morals’
Taḥṣīn al-Amwāl ‘Preserving Possessions’
Al-Umthāl 'Similes (Proverbs)';
Faḍīl al-Faras ‘alā al-Himlāj ‘Superiority of the Horse over the Pack Animal’
Al-Āsad wa-al-Dhi’b ‘The Lion and the Wolf’;
Al-Mulūk wa-al-Umam: al-Sālifah wa-al-Bāqiyah 'The Kings and the Nations: Those Extinct and Those Surviving';
Al-Quḍāh wa-al-Wulāh ‘Judges and Governors’;
Al-‘Ālim wa-al-Jāhil ‘The Wise and the Ignorant’;
Al-Nard wa-al-Shaṭranj Al-Nard and Chess’;
Ghashsh al-Ṣina‘āt  ‘Adulteration of the Crafts’
Khuṣūmat al-Ḥūl wa-al-‘Ūr ‘Dispute between the Cross-Eyed Man and the Man Blind in One Eye’
Dhawī al-‘Āhāt ‘Stricken by Blights’
Al-Mughannīyīn ‘The Singers’
Akhlāq al-Shuṭṭār ‘The Manners of Those Who Pester Their Friends’.

Epistles 
 Risālatuhu alā Abū al-Faraj ibn Najjāḥ fī imtiḥān ‘uqūl al-awliyā’() 'His epistle to Abū al-Faraj ibn Najjāḥ about examining the wise ideas (minds) of the ancients';
Risālatuhu alā Abū Najm fī al-kharāj 'His epistle to Abū al-Najm about the land tax';
Risālatuhu fī al-qalm 'His epistle about the pen (script)';
Risālatuhu fī faḍl ittikhādh al-kutub 'His epistle about excellence in choice of books;
Risālatuhu kitmān al-sirr 'His epistle about keeping a secret';
Risālatuhu madh al-nabīdh 'His epistle about praise of wine';
Risālatuhu dhamm al-nabīdh 'His epistle about the reproach of wine';
Risālatuhu al-‘afw wa-al-ṣafḥ 'His epistle about forgiveness and pardon';
Risālatuhu ithm al-sukr ‘His epistle about the offense of drunkenness’;
Risālatuhu al-amal wa-al-ma’mūl ‘His epistle about hope and the hoped-for’;
Risālatuhu fī al-ḥilyah ‘His epistle about ornament (elegance of literary style);’
Risālatuhu dhamm al-kuttāb ‘His epistle about the reproach of secretaries;
Risālatuhu fī madh al-warrāqūn ‘His epistle in praise of the warrāqūn’;
Risālatuhu fī mawh al-Kitāb ‘His epistle on suggestiveness of the book;
Risālatuhu fī dhamihim ‘His epistle about reproaching them’;
Risālatuhu fiman  ‘His epistle about who among the poets was named ‘Umar’;
Risālatuhu fī farq jahl Ya‘qūb ibn Isḥāq al-Kindī ‘His epistle about the excess of the ignorance of Ya‘qūb ibn Isḥāq al-Kindī’;
Risālatuhu fī al-karmi alā Abū al-Faraj ibn Najah ‘His epistle about generosity; addressed to Abū al-Faraj ibn Najah;
Risālatuhu al-yatīmah ‘His epistle about the unique’;
Risālatuhu fī maut Abū Ḥarb al-Ṣaffār al-Baṣrī’ ‘His epistle about the death of Abū Ḥarb al-Ṣaffār al-Baṣrī’;
Risālatuhu fī al-mīrāth ‘His epistle about inheritance’;
Risālatuhu fī kīmiyā’ wa-al-kīmiyā’ ‘His epistle about Alchemy and Alchemy;
Risālatuhu fī al-istibdād wa-al-mushāwarah fī al-ḥarb ‘His epistle about obstinate arbitrariness and consultation in War’;
Risālatuhu al-radd ‘alā al-qawlīyah ‘His epistle about refutation of the qawlīyah.

Additional letters

Written in the handwriting of Ibn al-Furāt, near the epistles of al-Jāḥiẓ, in the Beatty MS of al-Nadīm's al-Fihrist:
 Epistle to Aḥmad ibn Isrā’īl;
 Epistle to Aḥmad ibn al-Munajjim, about care of speech (ḥifẓ al-lisān);
 Another epistle to Aḥmad ibn al-Munajjim;
 Epistle to Sulaymān ibn Wahb;
 Epistle to al-Ḥasan ibn Wahb;
Risālat ‘alā  Muḥammad ibn ‘Abd al-Mālik fī al-ghaḍab wa-al-riḍā’ 'Epistle to Muḥammad ibn ‘Abd al-Mālik, about anger and satisfaction';
Al-shukr epistle about thanks (praise);
Al-jidd wa-al-hazl epistle about earnestness and joking;
 Epistle about the description of the important matters concerning the creation of the Qur’ān, about which there are also five other epistles;
 Epistle to Muḥammad al-Yazīdī;
 Four epistles to Ibn Najāḥ Abū al-Faraj, (fl. 870) about the mind, judgment, and other things (al-‘aql al-ḥukm wa-ghayrihi);
 Epistle to Abū ‘Amr Aḥmad ibn Sa’īd, to whom three other epistles were also addressed.
 Epistle to ‘Ubayd Allāh ibn Yaḥyā ibn Khāqān;
 Epistle to Ibn Abī Dā’ūd about the book “Order of the Qur’ān” (Naẓm al-Qur’ān);
 Also an epistle addressed to him about the qualities of the book “The Judicial Interpretation (Al-Futyā); 
 Epistle to Abū al-Walīd ibn Aḥmad about cauterization (Al-kayy);
 Epistle to ‘Abdān ibn Abī Ḥarb, to whom he also addressed two other epistles;
 Epistle about the reproach for what is plagiarized; 
 Epistle to Aḥmad ibn Hamdūn al-Nadīm about the qualities of a court companion (ṣifāt al-nadīm);
 Epistle to Aḥmad ibn al-Mudabbir;
 Ḥifẓ al-Sirr wa-al-Lisān  
‘Epistle to Aḥmad ibn al-Mudabbir ‘Awn; about guarding a secret and use of the tongue;
 Epistle to the Commander of the Faithful al-Muntaẓar bi-Allāh Muḥammad ibn al-Ḥasan; 
 Epistle to Aḥmad ibn al-Khaṭīb, which was the last epistle listed in the handwriting of Ibn al-Furāt.

Notes

References

External links

 
 
 Chester Beatty_Al-Fihrist_Ar_3315
  Kitāb al-Fihrist by al-Nadīm, pp.237-240

Jahiz
Scholars from the Abbasid Caliphate